Malich-e Kuchek (also Romanized as Malīch-e Kūchek and Meleych-e Kūchek; also known as Malaché Dow and Malīch) is a village in Qaleh Chenan Rural District, in the Central District of Karun County, Khuzestan Province, Iran. At the 2006 census, its population was 23, in 4 families.

References 

Populated places in Karun County